Quadriviridae is a family of double-stranded RNA viruses with a single genus Quadrivirus. The fungi Rosellinia necatrix serves as a natural host. The name of the group derives from the quadripartite genome of its members where in Latin quad means four. There is only one species in this family: Rosellinia necatrix quadrivirus 1.

Structure

Mycoviruses in the family Quadriviridae have a non-enveloped isometric capsid which consists of 60 copies of heterodimers of the structural proteins P2 and P4. The diameter of the capsid is around 48 nm.

Genome

Family member genomes are composed of double-stranded RNA. They are divided in to four segments which each code for a protein. The length of the different segments are between 3.5 to 5.0 kbp. The total genome is around 16.8 kbp. Inside the capsid with the genome there is also the RNA-dependent RNA polymerase.

Life cycle
Quadriviruses are transmitted internally. They are propagated during cell division and hyphal anastomosis. Viral replication occurs in the cytoplasm.  It follows the double-stranded RNA virus replication model. Double-stranded RNA virus transcription is the method of transcription.  The fungi Rosellinia necatrix serves as a natural host.

Taxonomy

The family Quadrivirdae has one genus Quadrivirus which contains the species:
 Rosellinia necatrix quadrivirus 1

References

External links
 ICTV Report:  Quadriviridae
 Viralzone: Quadriviridae

 
Virus families
Riboviria